Agia Triada is a former municipality in Kastoria regional unit, Western Macedonia, Greece. Since the 2011 local government reform it is part of the municipality Kastoria, of which it is a municipal unit. The municipal unit has an area of 99.092 km2. Population 6,568 (2011). The seat of the municipality was in Maniakoi.

References

Populated places in Kastoria (regional unit)
Former municipalities in Western Macedonia

bg:Света Троица (дем)